Hélène Carrère d'Encausse (born Hélène Zourabichvili; 6 July 1929) is a French political historian of Georgian origin, specializing in Russian history. Since 1999, she has served as the Perpetual Secretary of the Académie française, to which she was first elected in 1990.

Carrère d'Encausse was a member of the European Parliament between 1994 and 1999, representing the Gaullist-conservative party RPR. She was awarded the Lomonosov Gold Medal and Grand Cross with Star of the Order of Merit of the Republic of Poland in 2008 and 2011, respectively. She is a cousin of Salome Zourabichvili, the current President of Georgia.

Family and career 
Carrère d'Encausse was born Hélène Zourabichvili in Paris into a family of Georgian émigrés. She is a cousin of Salome Zourabichvili, the current President of Georgia. Her son, Emmanuel Carrère (born 1957), is a French author, screenwriter and director. Carrère d'Encausse graduated from Institut d'Études Politiques de Paris and was elected to seat 14 of the Académie française in 1990, later becoming the Académie's Perpetual Secretary in 1999. Her academician's sword was made by a Franco-Georgian sculptor Goudji.

Russian scholarship

The bulk of Carrère d'Encausse's work has been on Russia and the Soviet Union.  She has had over two dozen books published in French, many of which have been translated into English. Her 1978 work L'empire éclaté: La révolte des nations en U.R.S.S (English version, Decline of an Empire: The Soviet Socialist Republics in Revolt) predicted that the Soviet Union was destined to break up along the lines of its 15 constituent republics. In commenting on current Russian affairs, Carrère d'Encausse has warned against applying Western yardsticks to Russian democracy and has said that she regrets the "excessive diabolization" of the regime of Vladimir Putin.

Controversy
In 2005, Carrère d'Encausse joined other French politicians in identifying polygamy as one of the causes of the 2005 civil unrest in France. During an interview given to the Russian television channel NTV, she claimed:Why can't their parents buy an apartment? It's clear why. Many of these Africans, I tell you, are polygamous. In an apartment, there are three or four wives and 25 children.These and similar remarks by others, including Nicolas Sarkozy and Bernard Accoyer, were disputed by the antiracist group MRAP, which blamed the unrest on French racism.

Honours 
  : Commander of the Order of Cultural Merit (November 1999)

References

Bibliography 
 1963  Réforme et révolution chez les musulmans de l'Empire russe  (Armand Colin)
 1966  Le Marxisme et l'Asie (avec Stuart R. Schram), 1853-1964  (Armand Colin)
 1967  Central Asia, a century of Russian rule, Columbia Univ., réédition 1990  (Duke Univ. publication)
 1969  L'URSS et la Chine devant la révolution des sociétés pré-industrielles (avec Stuart R. Schram)  (Armand Colin)
 1972  L'Union soviétique de Lénine à Staline  (Éd. Richelieu)
 1975  La Politique soviétique au Moyen-Orient, 1955-1975  (Presses de la F.N.S.P.)
 1978  L'Empire éclaté  (Flammarion)
 1979  Lénine, la Révolution et le Pouvoir  (Flammarion)
 1979  Staline, l'ordre par la terreur  (Flammarion)
 1980  Le Pouvoir confisqué  (Flammarion)
 1982  Le Grand Frère  (Flammarion)
 1985  La déstalinisation commence  (Complexe)
 1986  Ni paix ni guerre  (Flammarion)
 1987  Le Grand Défi  (Flammarion)
 1988  Le Malheur russe  (Fayard)
 1990  La Gloire des Nations  (Fayard)
 1992  Victorieuse Russie  (Fayard)
 1993  L'URSS, de la Révolution à la mort de Staline  (Le Seuil)
 1996  Nicolas II, La transition interrompue  (Fayard)
 1998  Lénine  (Fayard)
 2000  La Russie inachevée  (Fayard)
 2002  Catherine II  (Fayard)
 2003  L'Impératrice et l'abbé : un duel littéraire inédit  (Fayard)
 2005  L'Empire d'Eurasie  (Fayard)

External links
  Home page at the Académie française

1929 births
Living people
Writers from Paris
Sciences Po alumni
20th-century French historians
Members of the Académie Française
Foreign Members of the Russian Academy of Sciences
Foreign Members of the Russian Academy of Arts
Central Asian studies scholars
French people of Georgian descent
French people of Russian descent
Grand Croix of the Légion d'honneur
Commandeurs of the Ordre des Arts et des Lettres
Officers of the Ordre national du Mérite
Commanders with Star of the Order of Merit of the Republic of Poland
Commanders of the Order of Cultural Merit (Monaco)
Commandeurs of the Ordre des Palmes Académiques
Recipients of the Lomonosov Gold Medal
Zourabichvili family